Widji Thukul (born 26 August 1963) is an Indonesian poet and activist. His work is political, often critical of the Indonesian government and the social conditions of the country. He has been missing since 1998.

Life
Born on 26 August 1963, Thukul attended junior high school, but left middle school in 1982 due to his family's financial constraints. Early jobs included newspaper-seller, ticket-scalper, and finisher in a furniture shop.

As well as being a poet, Thukul was also a musician and also accompanied a theatre group, Theater Jagat, around Solo.

In 1988, Thukul married Dyah Sujirah. They had two children. Together they founded an arts group called Sanggar Suka Banjir (Frequent Flooding Studio).

Thukul helped organize workers demonstrations and was a member of Partai Rakyat Demokratik (People's Democratic Party). In a worker demonstration in 1995, Thukul was struck in the eye by a rifle butt, causing permanent damage to his sight.

His last contact with his wife was in February 1998. In April of that year he was seen in a demonstration in Tangerang but has not been seen since. It is suspected that he was one of many anti-government protesters abducted by government forces during the anti-Suharto demonstrations.

Publications
 Puisi Pelo (Lisping Poetry), published by Taman Budaya Surakata, Solo, 1984.
 Darman dan Lain-lain (Darman and the Others), published by Taman Budaya Surakata, Solo, 1994.
 Mencari Tanah Lapang (Looking for an Open Plot of Land), published by Manus Amici, 1994.
 Aku Ingin Jadi Peluru (I Want to be a Bullet), published by IndonesiaTera, Magelang, 2000.

Awards
Thukul's Looking for an Open Plot of Land won the 'Encourage Award' from the Netherlands-based Wertheim Foundation.

See also 
List of people who disappeared

References

Notes
Some of this information in this article is taken from the biographical essay 'Wiji Thukul: People's Poet' by Tinuk R. Yampolsky, in Menagerie 5, edited by John McGlynn and Laora Arkeman, Lontar Foundation, Jakarta, 2003.

External links
 Translation into English of some of Thukul's poems

1963 births
1990s missing person cases
20th-century Indonesian poets
20th-century male writers
Indonesian male poets
Indonesian human rights activists
Political repression in Indonesia
Missing people
Missing person cases in Indonesia
Possibly living people